Alexander Alexandrovich Majorov (born 19 July 1991) is a Swedish retired figure skater. He is the 2017 Winter Universiade bronze medalist, the 2011 World Junior bronze medalist, a five-time Nordic champion (2011–14 and 2016), and a four-time Swedish national champion (2012–14, 2017). His best finish at the European Championships is 6th (2013). He was 14th at the 2014 Winter Olympics.

Personal life 
Majorov was born on 19 July 1991 in Saint Petersburg, Russia. When he was an infant, his family began spending half a year in Sweden and half in Russia, settling in Luleå when he was six years old. His father, Alexander senior, is a figure skating coach, who was the first coach of Alexei Yagudin. His mother, Irina Majorova, runs a dance and ballet school in Luleå. He has a younger brother, Nikolaj, who also competes in figure skating.

Majorov holds dual Swedish and Russian citizenship and speaks both languages. He has a degree in physiotherapy. He is a bone marrow donor for his father, who was diagnosed with severe MDS in June 2015 and acute leukaemia a few months later.

Career 
Majorov began competing on the ISU Junior Grand Prix series in 2005. He made his senior international debut at the 2007 Golden Spin of Zagreb, placing 11th, but continued competing also on the junior level.

In the 2009–10 season, Majorov was eighth at the 2010 World Junior Championships and ended his season by winning the senior silver medal at the Triglav Trophy.

In 2010–11, Majorov won his first JGP medal, bronze, at the JGP in Ostrava. He also won two senior events, the Ice Challenge in Graz and the 2010 NRW Trophy. In March 2011, he won the bronze medal at the World Junior Championships. It was Sweden's first ISU Championships medal in 74 years. Majorov had back problems in 2011.

In the 2011–12 season, Majorov finished 11th at the 2012 European Championships and 26th at the 2012 World Championships.

In 2012–13, Majorov was 6th at the 2013 European Championships and 18th at the 2013 World Championships.

In the 2015–16 season, Majorov placed 8th at the 2015 CS Finlandia Trophy and won silver medals at two events – the International Cup of Nice and Volvo Open Cup. To prepare for his father's treatment, one bag of blood was drawn from the skater a week before the Volvo Open Cup and another a week before the 2015 Rostelecom Cup, from which he withdrew. He withdrew from the Swedish Championships to recover after an operation to extract bone marrow for his father. Majorov won gold at the Nordics Open in February 2016. His withdrawal from the 2016 World Championships in Boston followed the detection of a precursor to a stress fracture of the pelvis.

Programs

Competitive highlights 
GP: Grand Prix; CS: Challenger Series; JGP: Junior Grand Prix

Detailed results
Small medals for short and free programs awarded only at ISU Championships. At team events, medals awarded for team results only.

References

External links 

Alexander Majorov  at Skate Sweden

Swedish male single skaters
1991 births
Living people
Figure skaters from Saint Petersburg
Russian emigrants to Sweden
World Junior Figure Skating Championships medalists
People from Luleå
Figure skaters at the 2014 Winter Olympics
Olympic figure skaters of Sweden
Universiade medalists in figure skating
Universiade bronze medalists for Sweden
Competitors at the 2017 Winter Universiade